May 5th is National Cartoonist Day, a world-wide celebration of cartoonists and their work. The National Cartoonist Society declared the date in the 1990s to promote support for the cartooning industry, and to recognize the impact they have had on society.

The date of May 5th was chosen to recognize the first appearance (in color) of the mischievous cartoon character "The Yellow Kid" in the New York World newspaper on May 5, 1895. The character was created by comic strip artist Richard F. Outcault, and was featured in his cartoon titled "At the Circus in Hogan's Alley".

See also 

 Cartoon
 Comic strip
 Editorial cartoon

References 

Unofficial observances
May observances
Cartooning events